Super 4 is a weekend Malayalam musical reality show which airs on Mazhavil Manorama and streams on ManoramaMAX.

Format
The musical extravaganza consisted of 16 singers from all over India, screened and chosen after several rounds of auditions. The highlight of the show is that the contestants choose one of the judges to be their captain who would groom them during their journey in the show.

Season 1
The season consisted of 16 contestants who were selected from auditions across Kerala. The season was judged by a panel of four. The contestants were divided into four groups, each led a judge. Shweta, Vyshakhan, Sreehari and Dev Prakash were the finalists. The season lasted from 4 February 2018 and to 22 October 2018.

Hosts
Vidhya
Vijitha (co-host in grand finale)

Judges
Sujatha Mohan
Shaan Rahman
Deepak Dev 
Sharreth

Mentor
Alphons Joseph

Winners

Season 2
The channel launched the Season 2 on 29 August 2020. The format of the show is there is total of 16 contestants and they equally divide 16 contestants into four groups named Vidhuannan jagajillies, Rimu jagajillies, Sithumani jagajillies and Jobaby jagajillies.. Show went off on October 10 2021 by Grand Finale.

Hosts
Vijay Ashok
Vidhya

Judges
Rimi Tomy
Jyotsna Radhakrishnan
Vidhu Prathap
Sithara Krishnakumar
Anoop Shankar (groomer)

Guests
Manju Warrier
Aparna Balamurali
Asha Sharath
Samyuktha Menon
Shaan Rahman
Gopi Sundar
Anu Sithara
Prayaga Martin
Ramesh Pisharody
Anna Ben
Benny P. Nayarambalam
Sunny Wayne
Aishwarya Lekshmi
Remya Nambeesan
Namitha Pramod

Winners - seniors

Season 3
The channel launched Season 3 exclusively for kids as a sequel to Super 4 Junior vs. Seniors tiltles Super 4 Juniors from 16 October 2021 to 10 April 2022.

Hosts
Main host
Mithun Ramesh

Replacement host
Juliet

Judges
Primary judges
Rimi Tomy / Vijay Yesudas
Jyotsna Radhakrishnan
Vidhu Prath
Sithara Krishnakumar
Anoop Shankar (Groomer)
Grand finale judges
Madhu Balakrishnan
Bijibal

Mentor
Anju Joseph

Guests
Jayaram
Anu Sithara
Unni Mukundan
Miya George
Vineeth Kumar
Rajisha Vijayan
Innocent
Vijay Yesudas
Vinay Forrt
Anna Rajan
Manasa Radhakrishnan
Prayaga Martin
Durga Krishna

Winners

Rounds
 From the Heart Round
 Duet Round
 Ammaydoppam Round
 Favourite Music Director Round
 Favourite Emotion Round
 Duet Round

References 

Malayalam-language television shows
2010s Indian television series
Indian music television series
Singing talent shows
Mazhavil Manorama original programming